The 2006 Le Mans Series was the third season of ACO Le Mans Series. It is a series for Le Mans prototype and Grand Touring style cars broken into 4 classes: LMP1, LMP2, GT1, and GT2. It began on 9 April and ended on 24 September after 5 rounds.

Schedule

† - The race in Istanbul was shortened from its original planned 1000 km to a limit of 4 hours due to a lack of fuel brought to the event by organizers.

‡ - This event was originally planned to be held at Monza, but had to be cancelled due to conflicts. Jarama was announced as its replacement.

Season results
Overall winner in bold.

Teams Championships
Points are awarded to the top 8 finishers in the order of 10-8-6-5-4-3-2-1. Teams with multiple entries do not have their cars combined, each entry number is scored separately in the championship. Cars failing to complete 70% of the winner's distance are not awarded points.

The top 2 finishers in each teams championship earn automatic entry to the following year's 24 Hours of Le Mans

LMP1 Standings

† - #9 Creation Autosportif broke the tie by having a best finish of 2nd compared to Chamberlain-Synergy's best of 3rd.

LMP2 Standings

† - ASM Team ended their involvement with Chamberlain-Synergy after round 2.  ASM Team's entry is considered new and thus the two team scores are not combined.

GT1 Standings

† - Team Modena ended their involvement with Cirtek after round 2. Team Modena's entry is considered new and thus the two team scores are not combined.

GT2 Standings

Drivers Championships
Points are awarded to the top 8 finishers in the order of 10-8-6-5-4-3-2-1.  Drivers who do not drive for at least one hour do not receive points.

Points are awarded to a single driver and car combination.  If a driver wins points driving a different car in a different event, those points are listed separately.  Drivers listed multiple times in the points standings are marked with an asterisk.

LMP1 Standings

LMP2 Standings

GT1 Standings

GT2 Standings

External links
 Le Mans Series homepage - English

 
European Le Mans Series seasons
European Le Mans Series
European Le Mans Series